Strontium-90 is a radioactive isotope of strontium produced by nuclear fission, with a half-life of 28.8 years. It undergoes β− decay into yttrium-90, with a decay energy of 0.546 MeV. Strontium-90 has applications in medicine and industry and is an isotope of concern in fallout from nuclear weapons, nuclear weapons testing, and nuclear accidents.

Radioactivity
Naturally occurring strontium is nonradioactive and nontoxic at levels normally found in the environment, but 90Sr is a radiation hazard. 90Sr undergoes β− decay with a half-life of 28.79 years and a decay energy of 0.546 MeV distributed to an electron, an antineutrino, and the yttrium isotope 90Y, which in turn undergoes β− decay with a half-life of 64 hours and a decay energy of 2.28 MeV distributed to an electron, an antineutrino, and 90Zr (zirconium), which is stable. Note that 90Sr/Y is almost a pure beta particle source; the gamma photon emission from the decay of 90Y is so infrequent that it can normally be ignored.

90Sr has a specific activity of 5.21 TBq/g.

Fission product
90Sr is a product of nuclear fission. It is present in significant amount in spent nuclear fuel, in radioactive waste from nuclear reactors and in nuclear fallout from nuclear tests.
For thermal neutron fission as in today's nuclear power plants, the fission product yield from uranium-235 is 5.7%, from uranium-233 6.6%, but from plutonium-239 only 2.0%.

Nuclear waste
Strontium-90 is classified as high-level waste. Its 29-year half-life means that it can take hundreds of years to decay to negligible levels. Exposure from contaminated water and food may increase the risk of leukemia and bone cancer.

Remediation 
Algae has shown selectivity for strontium in studies, where most plants used in bioremediation have not shown selectivity between calcium and strontium, often becoming saturated with calcium, which is greater in quantity and also present in nuclear waste.

Researchers have looked at the bioaccumulation of strontium by Scenedesmus spinosus (algae) in simulated wastewater. The study claims a highly selective biosorption capacity for strontium of S. spinosus, suggesting that it may be appropriate for use of nuclear wastewater.

A study of the pond alga Closterium moniliferum using stable strontium found that varying the ratio of barium to strontium in water improved strontium selectivity.

Biological effects

Biological activity
Strontium-90 is a "bone seeker" that exhibits biochemical behavior similar to calcium, the next lighter group 2 element. After entering the organism, most often by ingestion with contaminated food or water, about 70–80% of the dose gets excreted. Virtually all remaining strontium-90 is deposited in bones and bone marrow, with the remaining 1% remaining in blood and soft tissues. Its presence in bones can cause bone cancer, cancer of nearby tissues, and leukemia. Exposure to 90Sr can be tested by a bioassay, most commonly by urinalysis.

The biological half-life of strontium-90 in humans has variously been reported as from 14 to 600 days, 1000 days, 18 years, 30 years and, at an upper limit, 49 years. The wide-ranging published biological half life figures are explained by strontium's complex metabolism within the body. However, by averaging all excretion paths, the overall biological half life is estimated to be about 18 years.

The elimination rate of strontium-90 is strongly affected by age and sex, due to differences in bone metabolism.

Together with the caesium isotopes 134Cs and 137Cs, and the iodine isotope 131I, it was among the most important isotopes regarding health impacts after the Chernobyl disaster.
As strontium has an affinity to the calcium-sensing receptor of parathyroid cells that is similar to that of calcium, the increased risk of liquidators of the Chernobyl power plant to suffer from primary hyperparathyroidism could be explained by binding of strontium-90.

Uses

Radioisotope thermoelectric generators (RTGs)
The radioactive decay of strontium-90 generates a significant amount of heat, 0.95 W/g in the form of pure strontium metal or approximately 0.460 W/g as strontium titanate and is cheaper than the alternative 238Pu. It is used as a heat source in many Russian/Soviet radioisotope thermoelectric generators, usually in the form of strontium titanate. It was also used in the US "Sentinel" series of RTGs.

Industrial applications
90Sr finds use in industry as a radioactive source for thickness gauges.

Medical applications
90Sr finds extensive use in medicine as a radioactive source for superficial radiotherapy of some cancers. Controlled amounts of 90Sr and 89Sr can be used in treatment of bone cancer, and to treat coronary restenosis via vascular brachytherapy. It is also used as a radioactive tracer in medicine and agriculture.

Aerospace applications
90Sr is used as a blade inspection method in some helicopters with hollow blade spars to indicate if a crack has formed.

Radiological warfare

In April 1943, Enrico Fermi suggested to Robert Oppenheimer the possibility of using the radioactive byproducts from enrichment to contaminate the German food supply. The background was fear that the German atomic bomb project was already at an advanced stage, and Fermi was also skeptical at the time that an atomic bomb could be developed quickly enough. Oppenheimer discussed the proposal with Edward Teller, who suggested the use of strontium-90. James Bryant Conant and Leslie R. Groves were also briefed, but Oppenheimer wanted to proceed with the plan only if enough food could be contaminated with the weapon to kill half a million people.

90Sr contamination in the environment
Strontium-90 is not quite as likely as caesium-137 to be released as a part of a nuclear reactor accident because it is much less volatile, but is probably the most dangerous component of the radioactive fallout from a nuclear weapon.

A study of hundreds of thousands of deciduous teeth, collected by Dr. Louise Reiss and her colleagues as part of the Baby Tooth Survey, found a large increase in 90Sr levels through the 1950s and early 1960s. The study's final results showed that children born in St. Louis, Missouri, in 1963 had levels of 90Sr in their deciduous teeth that was 50 times higher than that found in children born in 1950, before the advent of large-scale atomic testing. Reviewers of the study predicted that the fallout would cause increased incidence of disease in those who absorbed strontium-90 into their bones. However, no follow up studies of the subjects have been performed, so the claim is untested.

An article with the study's initial findings was circulated to U.S. President John F. Kennedy in 1961, and helped convince him to sign the Partial Nuclear Test Ban Treaty with the United Kingdom and Soviet Union, ending the above-ground nuclear weapons testing that placed the greatest amounts of nuclear fallout into the atmosphere.

The Chernobyl disaster released roughly 10 PBq, or about 5% of the core inventory, of strontium-90 into the environment. The Fukushima Daiichi disaster had from the accident until 2013 released 0.1 to 1 PBq of strontium-90 in the form of contaminated cooling water into the Pacific Ocean.

See also
 Gray and Sievert
 Radiation poisoning
 Strontium
 Yttrium-90
 Lia radiological accident

References

External links
NLM Hazardous Substances Databank – Strontium, Radioactive

Fission products
Strontium-090
Radioisotope fuels
Radioactive contamination